Debrunner is a surname. Notable people with the surname include:

Catherine Debrunner (born 1995), Swiss athlete
Hans Werner Debrunner (1923–1998), Swiss German historian and theologian
Irène Debrunner (born 1952), Swiss swimmer
Richard Debrunner (born 1937), Swiss wrestler

See also 
Debrunner Koenig Holding, a Swiss wholesale distributor